Katina Proestakis (born 14 June 2002) is a Chilean fencer. She competed in the women's foil event at the 2020 Summer Olympics held in Tokyo, Japan.

In 2017, she competed in the women's team foil event at the Pan American Fencing Championships held in Montreal, Canada.

She competed at the 2022 World Fencing Championships held in Cairo, Egypt.

References

External links
 

2002 births
Living people
Chilean female foil fencers
Olympic fencers of Chile
Fencers at the 2020 Summer Olympics
Place of birth missing (living people)
21st-century Chilean women